Cardonville is a commune in the Calvados department and Normandy region of north-western France.

History

World War II
After the liberation of the area by Allied Forces in early June 1944, engineers of the Ninth Air Force IX Engineering Command began construction of a combat Advanced Landing Ground outside of the town.  Declared operational on 14 June, the airfield was designated as "A-3", it was used by the 368th Fighter Group which flew P-47 Thunderbolts until the end of August when the unit moved into Central France.  Along with the 368th, the 370th Fighter Group flew P-38 Lightnings from the airfield until mid-August.  With the combat units moved out, the airfield was closed.

Population

See also
Communes of the Calvados department

References

Communes of Calvados (department)
Calvados communes articles needing translation from French Wikipedia